"East St Louis Toodle-Oo" (also "Toodle-O") is a composition written by Duke Ellington and Bubber Miley and recorded several times by Ellington for various labels from 1926–1930 under various titles. This song was the first charting single for Duke Ellington in 1927 and was one of the main examples of his early "jungle music". This composition was covered by Steely Dan on their 1974 album Pretzel Logic.

Recording history 
Ellington first recorded "Toodle-Oo" in November 1926 for Vocalion Records, which was released as Vo (1064). He recorded the composition twice more in early 1927 for Brunswick Records; the first version was not released at the time, but the second was released as Br (3480). He recorded his hit version in March 1927 for Columbia Records, under the name "the Washingtonians". Along with recording "Toodle-Oo", two other compositions were recorded at the same session, "Hop Head" and "Down in Our Alley Blues", the former of which would be released as the B-side of Columbia 953-D.
 November 29, 1926 E-4110  Vocalion 1064
 February 3, 1927 E-21636 E-21637 E-21538  Brunswick rejected
 March 14, 1927 E-21872 Brunswick 3480, Brunswick 6801, Brunswick 80000, Vocalion 1064 (some later pressings)
 March 22, 1927 W 143705-3 Columbia 953-D
 December 19, 1927 41245-1 Victor 21703
 December 19, 1927 41245-2 Victor 21703, Bluebird B-6430, Montgomery Ward M-4889
 January 19, 1928 W 400032-A OKeh 8638 (as "Harlem Twist", by Lonnie Johnson's Harlem Footwarmers, which features Johnson on guitar)
 March ?, 1928 2944-A and B Cameo 8182, Lincoln 2837, Romeo 612 (as The Washingtonians), and 108079-1 Pathe 36781, Perfect 14962 (as The Whoopee Makers) (identical to one of the takes of 2944)
 April 3, 1930 150167-3 Diva 6046-G, Velvet Tone 7072-V (as Mills' Ten Black Berries)
 February 9, 1932 71812-2 and 3 Victor L-16007 (33 1/3 10" long playing transcription, first part of a 3-song medley)
 March 5, 1937 M-180-1 Master MA-101, Brunswick m7989 (as "The New East St. Louis Toodle-O")
 February 7, 1956 Bethlehem Be BCP-60

Music 
"East St. Louis Toodle-Oo" features a growling plunger-muted trumpet part played by co-composer Bubber Miley, one of the first jazz trumpeters to utilize the style. This style was carried on by later Ellington trumpeters Cootie Williams (1937 recording), and Ray Nance (1956 recording).

For Steely Dan's 1974 cover of the song, Walter Becker played the melody through a talk box to imitate Miley's trumpet style, while Jeff "Skunk" Baxter used a pedal steel guitar for the trombone part.

Other notable recordings 
 Dave Grusin – Homage to Duke (1993)

References 

Compositions by Duke Ellington
Steely Dan songs
Jazz compositions in C minor
Vocalion Records singles
Brunswick Records singles
Columbia Records singles
Okeh Records singles